Provanna muricata is a species of sea snail, a marine gastropod mollusk in the family Provannidae.

Description

Distribution
This species occurs in East Pacific hydrothermal vents at the Galapagos Rift.

References

Four new species of Provanna Dall (Prosobranchia, Cerithiacea?) from East Pacific hydrothermal sites. Zoologica Scripta 15(2): 157-164

External links
 Warén A. & Bouchet P. (2001). Gastropoda and Monoplacophora from hydrothermal vents and seeps new taxa and records. The Veliger 44(2): 116–231

muricata
Gastropods described in 1986